Tuxentius ertli, the Ertli's Pierrot, is a butterfly in the family Lycaenidae. It is found in Tanzania, Malawi and Zambia. The habitat consists of woodland at high elevations.

The larvae feed on Gouania longispicata.

References

Butterflies described in 1907
Polyommatini